Spoiler is a 1998 American action sci-fi film directed by Jeff Burr and starring Gary Daniels and Meg Foster. It takes place in New York in the far future.

Plot summary

In a futuristic, cyber-punk New York City, convicted felon Roger Mason (Gary Daniels) is serving a sentence and is locked away in a high security prison facility, where Cryonics are applied to some of the inmates, including Mason himself, to keep them in a state of suspended animation. Mason, despite all the security measures applied at his confinement facility, manages to escape repeatedly to see his daughter, which is the only reason why he's making attempt after attempt to break free. However, the authorities are able to catch him and bring him back every time to serve even a longer sentence as punishment for his attempts to escape. Since he's being cryonically frozen to serve his time for years at a time, he remains practically the same age while his daughter grows older normally. As more and more time keeps being added to his original sentence, his escape attempts become more of an obsession rather than a goal.

Cast
Gary Daniels as Roger Mason
Meg Foster as Woman #1
Bryan Genesse as Bounty #1 
Jeffrey Combs as the Captain 
Nicholas Sadler as Renny 
Steven Schub as Phil 
Stewart Finlay-McLennan as Lory* 
Joe Unger as Clemets 
Sarah Freeman as Maggie** 
David Groh as Uncle Hutchy 
Bruce Glover as the Priest 
Jean Speegle Howard as Jillian/Jennifer 
Willard E. Pugh as Bounty #2 
Duane Whitaker as Sergeant 
Arye Gross as The Attendant

*Credited as Stewart McLennan.
**Credited as Sarah Rayne.

Release
Spoiler was released directly to video in VHS format on 15 September 1998 in the United States and on 30 November 2000 in Germany. It has also been released on DVD on 12 March 2010 in Germany.

References

External links
 http://www.new-video.de/film-spoiler-verdammt-im-eis/ (German)
 
 

1998 films
Films directed by Jeff Burr
New York City in popular culture
American science fiction action films
1990s English-language films
1990s American films